Michael Gillen may refer to:

 Chick Gillen (born 1933), Irish boxer
 Michael J. Gillen (1885–1942), American politician from New York